The Pennsylvania Interscholastic Athletic Association, Inc., also known by its acronymn PIAA, is one of the governing bodies of high school and middle school athletics for the Commonwealth of Pennsylvania, in the United States.

The PIAA's main office is located in the Harrisburg suburb of Mechanicsburg.

History 

The PIAA was founded in Pittsburgh on December 29, 1913. It is charged with serving its member schools and registered officials by establishing policies and adopting contest rules that emphasize the educational values of interscholastic athletics, promote safe and sportsmanlike competition, and provide uniform standards for all interscholastic levels of competition. As a result of the cooperative efforts of its membership, PIAA has assisted intermediate school, middle school, junior high school, and senior high school students in participating in interscholastic athletic programs on a fair and equitable basis, thus producing important education benefits.

Initially, and until 1972, PIAA membership was limited to public schools within the Commonwealth. It was and remains a voluntary organization For example, until 2004, public schools in Philadelphia did not participate in the PIAA.

Pennsylvania Catholic or other private schools were not eligible for PIAA membership. As a result, most Catholic schools belonged to another voluntary athletic organization, the Pennsylvania Catholic Interscholastic Athletic Association (PCIAA). This organization was founded in 1943 and mirrored the PIAA. However, in 1972, the Pennsylvania State Legislature altered the role of the PIAA and passed Act 219 which stated, "Private schools shall be permitted, if otherwise qualified, to be members of the Pennsylvania Interscholastic Athletic Association." The General Assembly's action in 1972 thus established the legislature's right to intervene in the PIAA's affairs, a precursor to other later interventions.

Although some predicted the legislation would lead to a merger of the PCIAA and PIAA, so many Catholic schools opted into the PIAA on their own that, two years later, after an abbreviated state basketball championship tournament in 1974, the PCIAA dissolved.

In 2000, the legislature again intervened and created the Pennsylvania Athletic Oversight Committee (PAOC). The PAOC is a 17-member oversight committee consisting of administrators, coaches and legislators to review what some had seen as the PIAA's unrestricted authority. The new law also called for several reforms including switching to a competitive process for selecting sites for championship games, eliminating the restitution rule, which required school districts that lose court cases against the PIAA to pay the associations legal fees and that persons involved in interscholastic athletics be provided equality of opportunity and treatment without discrimination.

Timeline 

 1913: PIAA established
 1920: Pennsylvania basketball playoffs instituted (Class A Only)
 1943: PCIAA established
 1945: Basketball playoffs expand to Class A & B
 1948: Basketball playoffs expand to Class A, B & C
 1972: Act 219 signed into law, allows private schools to join PIAA
 1973: Pennsylvania girls' basketball playoffs instituted (Class A only)
 1974: PCIAA dissolved
 1976: Girls' basketball playoffs expand to Class AA and AAA; Boys' basketball playoffs designated A, AA and AAA
 1984: Basketball expands to 4 classes
 1988: Football playoffs instituted (four classes)
 1997: Pennsylvania passes charter school law
 2000: Act 91 becomes law; PAOC established, PIAA cannot discriminate
 2003: Philadelphia public league joins PIAA
 2007: PIAA investigates separation of public and private classes
 2008: Philadelphia Catholic League joins PIAA
 2012: PIAA votes down separation for “Boundary” and “Non-boundary” schools
 2015: PIAA approves expansion to six classes for football and basketball
 2018: PIAA prohibits students who transfer during the 10th grade and after from participating in the postseason for one year unless given a waiver, effective for the 2018 school year; competitive balance rule also passed, effective in 2020, teams could be bumped up in classification depending on success or use of transfer athletes. A very controversial rule, as those moving from public school to public school are forced to abide by this rule.

Districts 
The PIAA divides its member schools' counties into 12 geographical districts for the purpose of state championship competition. The following list is the district breakdown by county.
 PIAA District 1: Bucks, Chester, Delaware, and Montgomery
 District 2: Lackawanna, Luzerne, Pike, Susquehanna, Wayne and Wyoming
 District 3: Adams, Berks, Cumberland, Dauphin, Franklin, Juniata, Lancaster, Lebanon, Perry and York
 District 4: Bradford, Columbia, Lycoming, Montour, Northumberland, Snyder, Sullivan, Tioga and Union
 District 5: Bedford, Fulton and Somerset
 District 6: Blair, Cambria, Centre, Clearfield, Clinton, Huntingdon, Indiana and Mifflin
 District 7, better known as the WPIAL: Allegheny (except for City of Pittsburgh), Armstrong, Beaver, Butler, Fayette, Greene, Lawrence, Washington and Westmoreland.
 District 8: Pittsburgh Public Schools
 District 9: Cameron, Clarion, Elk, Jefferson, McKean and Potter
 District 10: Crawford, Erie, Forest, Mercer, Venango and Warren
 District 11: Carbon, Lehigh, Monroe, Northampton and Schuylkill
 District 12: Philadelphia Catholic League and the Public League

While this is a general outline of the districts, there are some notable exceptions:
 Private schools within District 8 (City of Pittsburgh) compete in the WPIAL.
 Inter-Academic League and the Friends Schools League are not members of the PIAA, but compete independently as their own organizations. Other private schools in Philadelphia County compete in District 1.
 Philadelphia Catholic League schools previously competed independently as its own organization, but joined the PIAA for the 2007–2008 school year and began participating in playoffs by 2008–2009 within District 12.
 Boyertown Area Senior High School, in Berks County, is a member of District 1.
 Slippery Rock Area High School, in Butler County, is a member of District 10.
 Moniteau School District, also in Butler County, is a member of district 9.
 Galeton Area School District, in Potter County, competes in District 4
 Indiana High School, in Indiana County, is a WPIAL member. 
 Hollidaysburg Area High School is also a member of District 6 but competes as an independent in football only.
 Palisades High School, in Bucks County, is a member of District 11.
 Fannett-Metal High School, in Franklin County, is a member of District 5.
 Curwensville Area High School, DuBois Area Senior High School, DuBois Central Catholic, and Clearfield Area High School, in Clearfield County, are members of District 9.
 Keystone Central School District is the only district entirely composed of Clinton County municipalities. The larger of the district's two high schools, Central Mountain, is a member of District 6, while the other, Bucktail High School, is a member of District 4.
 Sheffield Area Middle/High School, in Warren County, is the only member in the Warren County School District that is a member of District 9, rejoining in 2005 after several decades in District 10. The other WCSD schools (Warren, Youngsville, Eisenhower) are still in District 10.
 West Shamokin High School originally participated in the WPIAL, but moved to District 6 in 2016.
 Karns City High School, in Butler and Armstrong counties, is a member of District 9.

East vs. West 

Traditionally for state championship competition for team sports, Pennsylvania is divided into Eastern and Western regions. Districts 1, 2, 3, 4, 11, and 12 usually make up the Eastern Region; Districts 5, 6, 7, 8, 9, 10 usually comprise the Western Region. The winners of each region compete against each other for the state championship. However, since the creation of District 12 with the admission of the Philadelphia Public Schools into the PIAA, the East vs. West format has been abandoned for some sports in certain classifications, particularly at the Class AAAA level where there are more large schools in the East. For example, in PIAA football, District 3 schools compete in the early rounds of the state playoffs against Philadelphia schools in some classes, and against Pittsburgh schools in others.

Sports 

The PIAA sponsors 16 boys' sports and 16 girls' sports. However, the PIAA only sponsors state championships for 12 boys' sports and 11 girls' sports. The following is a list of PIAA sponsored sports championships.
 Boys' sports: baseball, basketball, cross country, football, golf, lacrosse, soccer, swimming & diving, tennis, track and field, volleyball and wrestling
 Girls' sports: basketball, competitive spirit, cross country, field hockey, golf, lacrosse, soccer, softball, swimming and diving, tennis, track and field and volleyball

There are Pennsylvania schools that offer sports not fully sponsored by the PIAA such as gymnastics, ice hockey, bowling, rifle, water polo and other Olympic sports. These sports are governed by other sport specific bodies that use similar PIAA rules for classification and eligibility, but are not officially recognized as state champions by the PIAA. The PIAA took over jurisdiction of both boys' and girls' lacrosse in July 2008. Indoor Track and field is not sponsored by the PIAA, but allowed under PIAA rules. The PTFCA  governs indoor track and field instead of the PIAA in Pennsylvania.

School classifications 

Every two years, the PIAA divides the member schools into two to six different classifications for each sport, depending on the number of male or female students enrolled in each school.

The number of statewide member schools participating in a particular sport will determine how many different classifications there will be. For example, boys' volleyball, the sport with the smallest number of participating schools, only has a AA or AAA classification. By comparison, boys' basketball, which has the largest number of participating schools, has A, AA, AAA, AAAA, AAAAA, AAAAAA classifications. The number of A's signify how large or small the school is; Class A is the smallest classification while AAAAAA is the largest. The PIAA tries to place an equal number of schools in each classification.

Football enrollment requirements

School Classifications for Football 

Because the PIAA determines classifications separately for each gender in each sport, it is possible that a coeducational school may find its boys' and girls' teams in different classes in the same sport. Smaller schools can choose to compete at a higher classification—possible reasons are to maintain existing rivalries, or in rare cases to place their boys' and girls' teams in the same class—but larger schools can not choose to compete at a lower classification level. For purposes of all-star games and awards, the A and AA classes are referred to as small schools, AAA and AAAA are referred to as mid-sized schools, while AAAAA and AAAAAA referred as large schools. In 2016, there was a change, splitting the football tournament into six classifications, instead of the previous four. The PIAA made the decision to expand to six classes in Football, as well as Boys and Girls basketball, baseball and softball. Increasing to four classes is Boys and Girls Soccer, Girls volleyball. Field Hockey is expanded to three classes, and Boys and Girls Lacrosse to two. Football started using these classes with the 2016 season.

Hershey, Pennsylvania 

While some sports' championship games have been held at various venues and cities across the state, no city is more associated with the PIAA than Hershey. Hershey's proximity to Harrisburg, as well as easy highway access via the Pennsylvania Turnpike and Interstates 81 and 83 for teams from across the state makes it an ideal location for the games. Hersheypark Stadium hosts the football, soccer, and lacrosse championships; the Parkview Cross Country Course, located across the street from Hershey Park and Chocolate World, hosts the cross country championships. The Giant Center hosts the basketball, wrestling, and competitive spirit championships. The Hershey Racquet Club hosts the tennis championships.

In 2006, the PIAA announced that they had refused Hershey's application for a contract extension to host the basketball championships at Giant Center. Starting for the 2006–2007 season, the eight championship games will be played at Penn State's Bryce Jordan Center. The PIAA cited monetary reasons for the move. As of 2014 they had returned to the Giant Center.

Even the non-PIAA sport of ice hockey hosted the 2005 Pennsylvania Cup championship at the historic Hersheypark Arena. The PIAA football championships have been contested since 1988, with the first games being held at various sites across the state. In 1992, the games were moved to Altoona's Mansion Park, in part because playing four games in two days would not affect the artificial turf playing surface on the field. The football championships were moved to Hershey in 1998 to add to the tradition of PIAA championship competition near the state capital.

State College hosts the baseball and softball championships at Pennsylvania State University. Altoona previously hosted the baseball championships at Peoples Natural Gas Field, home of the Altoona Curve of the Class AA Eastern League. The track and field championships are contested at Seth Grove Stadium on the campus of Shippensburg University, 40 miles southwest of Harrisburg.

Championship sites

Fall

Winter

Spring

Recent champions

Football 

Class 6A
 2021: Mt. Lebanon (District 7) over Saint Joseph's Prep (District 12) 35-17
 2020: Saint Joseph's Prep (District 12) over Central York (District 3) 62-13
 2019: Saint Joseph's Prep (District 12) over Central Dauphin (District 3) 35-13
 2018: Saint Joseph's Prep (District 12) over Harrisburg (District 3) 40-20
 2017: Pine-Richland (District 7) over Saint Joseph's Prep (District 12) 41-21
 2016: Saint Joseph's Prep (District 12) over Pittsburgh Central Catholic (District 7) 49-7

Class 5A
 2021: Penn-Trafford (District 7) over Imhotep Institute Charter High School (District 12) 17-14
 2020: Pine-Richland (District 7) over Cathedral Prep (District 10) 48-7
 2019: Archbishop Wood (District 12) over Cheltenham (District 1) 19-15
 2018: Penn Hills (District 7) over Manheim Central (District 3) 36-31
 2017: Archbishop Wood (District 12) over Gateway (District 7) 49-14
 2016: Archbishop Wood (District 12) over Harrisburg (District 3) 37-10

Class 4A
 2021: Aliquippa (District 7) over Bishop McDevitt (District 3) 34-27
 2020: Thomas Jefferson (District 7) over Jersey Shore (District 4) 21-14
 2019: Thomas Jefferson (District 7) over Dallas (District 2) 46-7
 2018: Cathedral Prep (District 10) over Imhotep Charter (District 12) 38-7
 2017: Cathedral Prep (District 10) over Imhotep Charter (District 12) 38-28
 2016: Cathedral Prep (District 10) over Imhotep Charter (District 12) 27-20
 2015: Pittsburgh Central Catholic (District 7) over Parkland (District 11) 21-18
 2014: Saint Joseph's Prep (District 12) over Pine-Richland (District 7) 49-41
 2013: Saint Joseph's Prep (District 12) over Pittsburgh Central Catholic (District 7) 35-10
 2012: North Allegheny (District 7) over Coatesville (District 1) 63-28
 2011: Central Dauphin (District 3) over North Penn (District 1) 14-7
 2010: North Allegheny (District 7) over La Salle College (District 12) 21-0
 2009: La Salle College (District 12) over State College (District 6) 24-7
 2008: Liberty (District 11) over Bethel Park (District 7) 28-21 OT
 2007: Pittsburgh Central Catholic (District 7) over Parkland (District 11) 35-21
 2006: Upper St. Clair (District 7) over Liberty (District 11) 47-13
 2005: McKeesport (District 7) over Liberty (District 11) 49-10
 2004: Pittsburgh Central Catholic (District 7) over Neshaminy (District 1) 49-14
 2003: North Penn (District 1) over Pittsburgh Central Catholic (District 7) 37-10
 2002: Parkland (District 11) over Woodland Hills (District 7) 34-12
 2001: Neshaminy (District 1) over Woodland Hills (District 7) 21-7
 2000: Cathedral Prep (District 10) over Central Bucks West (District 1) 41-35 OT
 1999: Central Bucks West (District 1) over Cathedral Prep (District 10) 14-13
 1998: Central Bucks West (District 1) over New Castle (District 7) 56-7
 1997: Central Bucks West (District 1) over Upper St. Clair (District 7) 44-20
 1996: Downingtown (District 1) over Woodland Hills (District 7) 49-14
 1995: Penn Hills (District 7) over Lower Dauphin (District 3) 35-14
 1994: McKeesport (District 7) over Downingtown (District 1) 17-14
 1993: North Hills (District 7) over Central Bucks West (District 1) 15-14
 1992: Cumberland Valley (District 3) over Upper St. Clair (District 7) 28-12
 1991: Central Bucks West (District 1) over Cathedral Prep (District 10) 26-14
 1990: North Allegheny (District 7) over Ridley (District 1) 21-14
 1989: Upper St. Clair (District 7) over Wilson (District 3) 12-7
 1988: Pittsburgh Central Catholic (District 7) over Cedar Cliff (District 3) 14-7

Class 3A
 2020: Central Valley (District 7) over Wyomissing (District 3) 35-21
 2019: Wyoming (District 2) over Central Valley (District 7) 21-14
 2018: Aliquippa (District 7) over Middletown (District 3) 35-0
 2017: Quaker Valley (District 7) over Middletown (District 3) 41-24
 2016: Beaver Falls (District 7) over Middletown (District 3) 30-13
 2015: Imhotep Charter (District 12) over Cathedral Prep (District 10) 40-3
 2014: Archbishop Wood (District 12) over Central Valley (District 7) 33-14
 2013: Archbishop Wood (District 12) over Bishop McDevitt (District 3) 22-10
 2012: Cathedral Prep (District 10) over Archbishop Wood (District 12) 24-14
 2011: Archbishop Wood (District 12) over Bishop McDevitt (District 3) 52-0
 2010: Allentown Central Catholic (District 11) over Bishop McDevitt (District 3) 28-27
 2009: Selinsgrove (District 4) over Manheim Central (District 3) 10-7
 2008: Thomas Jefferson (District 7) over Archbishop Wood (District 12) 34-7
 2007: Thomas Jefferson (District 7) over Garnet Valley (District 1) 28-3
 2006: General McLane (District 10) over Pottsville (District 11) 28-23
 2005: Franklin Regional (District 7) over Pottsville (District 11) 23-13
 2004: Thomas Jefferson (District 7) over Manheim Central (District 3) 56-20
 2003: Manheim Central (District 3) over Pine-Richland (District 7) 39-38 2OT
 2002: Hopewell (District 7) over Strath Haven (District 1) 21-10
 2001: West Allegheny (District 7) over Strath Haven (District 1) 28-13
 2000: Strath Haven (District 1) over West Allegheny (District 7) 31-28
 1999: Strath Haven (District 1) over West Allegheny (District 7) 21-7
 1998: Allentown Central Catholic (District 11) over Moon (District 7) 10-0
 1997: Berwick (District 2) over Perry Traditional Academy (District 8) 17-14
 1996: Berwick (District 2) over Blackhawk (District 7) 34-14
 1995: Berwick (District 2) over Sharon (District 10) 43-6
 1994: Berwick (District 2) over Sharon (District 10) 27-7
 1993: Allentown Central Catholic (District 11) over Blackhawk (District 7) 40-0
 1992: Berwick (District 2) over Blackhawk (District 7) 33-6
 1991: Strong Vincent (District 10) over Conestoga Valley (District 3) 29-20
 1990: Bethlehem Catholic (District 11) over Seton-La Salle (District 7) 43-7
 1989: Perry Traditional Academy (District 8) over Berwick (District 2) 20-8
 1988: Berwick (District 2) over Aliquippa (District 7) 13-0

Class 2A
 2020: Southern Columbia (District 4) over Wilmington (District 10) 42-14
 2019: Southern Columbia (District 4) over Avonworth (District 7) 74-7
 2018: Southern Columbia (District 4) over Wilmington (District 10) 49-14
 2017: Southern Columbia (District 4) over Wilmington (District 10) 48-0
 2016: Steel Valley (District 7) over Southern Columbia (District 4) 49-7
 2015: Southern Columbia (District 4) over Aliquippa (District 7) 49-14
 2014: South Fayette (District 7) over Dunmore (District 2) 28-16
 2013: South Fayette (District 7) over Imhotep Charter (District 12) 41-0
 2012: Wyomissing (District 3) over Aliquippa (District 7) 17-14
 2011: Lancaster Catholic (District 3) over Tyrone (District 6) 17-7
 2010: West Catholic (District 12) over South Fayette (District 7) 50-14
 2009: Lancaster Catholic (District 3) over Greensburg Central Catholic (District 7) 21-14
 2008: Wilmington (District 10) over West Catholic (District 12) 35-34 2OT
 2007: Jeannette (District 7) over Dunmore (District 2) 49-21
 2006: Wilson (District 11) over Jeannette (District 7) 29-28
 2005: South Park (District 7) over Wilson (District 11) 28-17
 2004: Lansdale Catholic (District 1) Grove City (District 10) 40-17
 2003: Aliquippa (District 7) over Northern Lehigh (District 11) 32-27
 2002: Mount Carmel (District 4) over Seton-La Salle (District 7) 18-13
 2001: Washington (District 7) over Pen Argyl (District 11) 19-12
 2000: Mount Carmel (District 4) over Aliquippa (District 7) 26-6
 1999: Tyrone (District 6) over Mount Carmel (District 4) 13-6
 1998: Mount Carmel (District 4) over Shady Side Academy (District 7) 44-7
 1997: South Park (District 7) over South Williamsport (District 4) 20-0
 1996: Mount Carmel (District 4) over Tyrone (District 6) 25-6
 1995: Bishop McDevitt (District 3) over Burrell (District 7) 29-0
 1994: Mount Carmel (District 11) over Forest Hills (District 6) 20-14 2OT
 1993: Dallas (District 2) over Washington (District 7) 31-7
 1992: Valley View (District 2) over East Allegheny (District 7) 21-13
 1991: Aliquippa (District 7) over Hanover (District 2) 27-0
 1990: Hanover Area (District 2) over Bishop Canevin (District 7) 20-19 OT
 1989: Hickory (District 10) over Montoursville (District 4) 30-22
 1988: Bethlehem Catholic (District 11) over Wilmington (District 7) 26-11

Class 1A
 2020: Steelton-Highspire (District 3) over Jeannette (District 7) 32-20
 2019: Farrell (District 10) over Bishop Guilfoyle (District 6) 10-7 OT
 2018: Farrell (District 10) over Lackawanna Trail (District 2) 55-20
 2017: Jeannette (District 7) over Homer-Center (District 6) 42-12
 2016: Bishop Guilfoyle (District 6) over Clairton (District 7) 17-0
 2015: Bishop Guilfoyle (District 6) over Farrell (District 10) 35-0
 2014: Bishop Guilfoyle (District 6) over Clairton (District 7) 19-18
 2013: North Catholic (District 7) over Old Forge (District 2) 15-14 OT
 2012: Clairton (District 7) over Dunmore (District 2) 20-0
 2011: Clairton (District 7) over Southern Columbia (District 4) 35-19
 2010: Clairton (District 7) over Riverside (District 2) 36-30
 2009: Clairton (District 7) over Bishop McCort (District 6) 15-3
 2008: Steelton-Highspire (District 3) over Clairton (District 7) 35-16
 2007: Steelton-Highspire (District 3) over Serra Catholic (District 7) 34-15
 2006: Southern Columbia (District 4) over West Middlesex (District 10) 56-14
 2005: Southern Columbia (District 4) over Duquesne (District 7) 50-19
 2004: Southern Columbia (District 4) over Rochester (District 7) 35-0
 2003: Southern Columbia (District 4) over Bishop Carroll (District 6) 49-20
 2002: Southern Columbia (District 4) over Rochester (District 7) 31-6
 2001: Rochester (District 7) over Southern Columbia (District 4) 16-0
 2000: Rochester (District 7) over Southern Columbia (District 4) 22-14
 1999: South Side (District 7) over Southern Columbia (District 4) 27-21
 1998: Rochester (District 7) over Southern Columbia (District 4) 18-0
 1997: Sharpsville (District 10) over Riverside (District 2) 10-7
 1996: Farrell (District 7) over Southern Columbia (District 4) 14-12
 1995: Farrell (District 7) over Southern Columbia (District 4) 6-0
 1994: Southern Columbia (District 4) over Western Beaver (District 7) 49-6
 1993: Duquesne (District 7) over South Williamsport (District 4) 24-21
 1992: Scotland School (District 3) over Smethport (District 9) 24-7
 1991: Schuylkill Haven (District 11) over Rochester (District 7) 28-18
 1990: Marian Catholic (District 11) over Farrell (District 10) 21-13
 1989: Dunmore (District 2) over Keystone (District 9) 57-18
 1988: Camp Hill (Division 3) over Cambridge Springs (District 10) 18-7

Basketball

Boys basketball
Class 6A
 2019: Kennedy Catholic (District 10) over Pennridge (District 1) 64-62 (2OT)
 2018: Roman Catholic (District 12) over Lincoln (District 12) 92-80
 2017: Reading Senior High School (District 3) over Pine-Richland (District 7) 64-60
Class 5A
 2021: Cathedral Prep (District 10) over Archbishop Ryan (District 12) 69-49
 2019: Moon Area (District 7) over Archbishop Wood (District 12) 74-64
 2018: Abington Heights (District 2) over Mars (District 7) 67-55
 2017: Archbishop Wood (District 12) over Meadville (District 10) 73-40
Class 4A
 2019: Imhotep Charter (District 12) over Bonner-Prendergast (District 12) 67-56
 2018: Imhotep Charter (District 12) over Sharon (District 10) 71-35
 2017: Imhotep Charter (District 12) over Strong Vincent (District 10) 80-52
 2016: Roman Catholic (District 12) over Taylor Allderdice (District 8) 73-62
 2015: Roman Catholic (District 12) over Martin Luther King (District 12) 62-45
 2014: New Castle (District 7) over LaSalle College (District 12) 52-39
 2013: Lower Merion (District 1) over Chester (District 1) 63-47
 2012: Chester (District 1) over Lower Merion (District 1) 59-33
 2011: Chester (District 1) over Mount Lebanon (District 7) 72-60 (OT)
 2010: Plymouth-Whitemarsh (District 1) over Penn Wood (District 1) 58-51
 2009: Penn Wood (District 1) over William Penn (District 12) 72-53
 2008: Chester (District 1) over Norristown (District 1) 81-77
 2007: Schenley (District 8) over Chester (District 1) 78-71
 2006: Lower Merion (District 1) over Schenley (District 8) 60-58
 2005: Chester (District 1) over Lower Merion (District 1) 74-61
 2004: Penn Hills (District 7) over Parkland (District 11) 57-48
 2003: State College (District 6) over Chester (District 1) 76-71
 2002: Harrisburg (District 3) over Uniontown (District 7) 69-62
 2001: Coatesville (District 1) over Schenley (District 8) 70-57
 2000: Chester (District 1) over Uniontown (District 7) 73-48
Class 3A
 2019: Lincoln Park Charter (District 7) over Trinity (District 3) 73-72
 2018: Neumann-Goretti (District 12) over Richland (District 6) 57-42
 2017: Neumann-Goretti (District 12) over Lincoln Park Charter (District 7) 89-58
 2016: Neumann-Goretti (District 12) over Mars (District 7) 99-66
 2015: Neumann-Goretti (District 12) over Archbishop Carroll (District 12) 69-67
 2014: Neumann-Goretti (District 12) over Susquehanna (District 3) 64-57 (OT)
 2013: Imhotep Charter (District 12) over Archbishop Carroll (District 12) 54-45
 2012: Neumann-Goretti (District 12) over Montour (District 7) 48-45
 2011: Neumann-Goretti (District 12) over Montour (District 7) 55-45
 2010: Neumann-Goretti (District 12) over Chartiers Valley (District 7) 65-63
 2009: Archbishop Carroll (District 12) over Greensburg-Salem (District 7) 75-54
 2008: Steelton-Highspire (District 3) over Susquehanna (District 3) 65-62
 2007: General McLane (District 10) over Greencastle-Antrim (District 3) 57-55
 2006: Franklin Area (District 10) Communications Tech (District 12) 74-63
 2005: Steelton-Highspire (District 3) over Johnstown (District 6) 70-48
 2004: Moon Area (District 7) over Holy Ghost Prep (District 1) 52-50
 2003: Lancaster Catholic (District 3) over Perry Traditional Academy (District 8) 75-59
 2002: Kennett (District 1) over West Mifflin (District 7) 72-51
 2001: Franklin Area (District 10) over Allentown Central Catholic (District 11) 58-50 (OT)
 2000: Steelton-Highspire (District 3) over Blackhawk (District 7) 68-56
Class 2A
 2019: MCS Charter (District 12) over Bishop Guilfoyle (District 6) 54-52
 2018: Constitution (District 12) over Our Lady of the Sacred Heart (District 7) 81-71
 2017: Sewickley Academy (District 7) over Constitution (District 12) 68-63 (OT)
 2016: Aliquippa (District 7) over Mastery Charter North (District 12) 68-49
 2015: Conwell-Egan (District 12) over Aliquippa (District 7) 62-51
 2014: Constitution (District 12) over Seton-La Salle (District 7) 61-59
 2013: Beaver Falls (District 7) over Holy Cross (District 2) 69-63
 2012: Imhotep Charter (District 12) over Beaver Falls (District 7) 56-54
 2011: Imhotep Charter (District 12) over Greensburg Central Catholic (District 7) 67-34
 2010: South Fayette (District 7) over Strawberry Mansion (District 12) 49-47
 2009: Imhotep Charter (District 12) over North Catholic (District 7) 75-67 (2OT)
 2008: Jeannette (District 7) over Strawberry Mansion (District 12) 76-72
 2007: Prep Charter (District 12) over Aliquippa (District 7) 68-66
 2006: Prep Charter (District 12) over Beaver Falls (District 7) 82-51
 2005: Beaver Falls (District 7) over York Catholic (District 3) 71-59
 2004: Sto-Rox (District 7) over Trinity (District 3) 62-53
 2003: Trinity (District 3) over Sto-Rox (District 7) 66-49
 2002: Bishop Hannan (District 2) over Sto-Rox (District 7) 70-68
 2001: Trinity (District 3) over Aliquippa (District 7) 79-65
 2000: Shady Side Academy (District 7) over Halifax (District 3) 79-65
Class 1A
 2019: Sankofa Freedom Academy (District 12) over Vincentian Academy (District 7) 83-61
 2018: Kennedy Catholic (District 10) over Lourdes Regional (District 4) 78-36
 2017: Kennedy Catholic (District 10) over Girard College (District 1) 73-56
 2016: Kennedy Catholic (District 10) over MCS Charter (District 12) 71-60
 2015: Constitution (District 12) over Farrell (District 10) 85-53
 2014: Lincoln Park Charter (District 7) over MCS Charter (District 12) 70-66
 2013: Vaux (District 12) over Johnsonburg (District 9) 83-63
 2012: Constitution (District 12) over Lincoln Park Charter (District 7) 68-46
 2011: MCS Charter (District 12) over Lincoln Park Charter (District 7) 70-55
 2010: Sewickley Academy (District 7) over Reading Central Catholic (District 3) 43-35
 2009: Girard College (District 1) over Kennedy Catholic (District 10) 80-70
 2008: Serra Catholic (District 7) over Friere Charter (District 12) 67-66
 2007: Reading Central Catholic (District 3) over DuBois Central Catholic (District 9) 58-33
 2006: Elk County Catholic (District 9) over Bishop Hannan (District 2) 71-61
 2005: Bishop O'Reilly (District 2) over Kennedy Catholic (District 10) 65-61
 2004: Bishop O'Reilly (District 2) over Sewickley Academy (District 7) 70-54
 2003: Scotland School (District 3) over Union Area (District 7) 80-59
 2002: Scotland School (District 3) over Kennedy Catholic (District 10) 69-50
 2001: Kennedy Christian (District 10) over Fairfield (District 3) 87-45
 2000: Kennedy Christian (District 10) over Bishop Hannan (District 2) 64-57 (OT)

Girls' basketball
Class 6A
 2019: Peters Township (District 7) over Garnet Valley (District 1) 62-49
 2018: Upper Dublin (District 1) over Central Bucks South (District 1) 41-39
 2017: Boyertown (District 1) over North Allegheny (District 7) 46-35
Class 5A
 2019: Chartiers Valley (District 7) over Archbishop Carroll (District 12) 53-40
 2018: Mars (District 7) over Archbishop Wood (District 12) 36-33
 2017: Archbishop Wood (District 12) over Trinity (District 7) 34-26
Class 4A
 2019: Bethlehem Catholic (District 11) over North Catholic High School (District 7) 60-49
 2018: Lancaster Catholic (District 3) over Berks Catholic (District 3) 51-36
 2017: Bethlehem Catholic (District 11) over Villa Maria (District 10) 46-27
 2016: Cumberland Valley (District 3) over Cardinal O'Hara (District 12) 57-34
 2015: Cumberland Valley (District 3) over Central Bucks West (District 1) 40-35
 2014: Cumberland Valley (District 3) over Spring-Ford (District 1) 49-30
 2013: Spring-Ford (District 1) over Cumberland Valley (District 3) 60-45
 2012: Archbishop Carroll (District 12) over Oakland Catholic (District 7) 56-37
 2011: Mount Lebanon (District 7) over Archbishop Carroll (District 12) 47-46
 2010: Mount Lebanon (District 7) over Archbishop Ryan (District 12) 70-43
 2009: Mount Lebanon (District 7) over Cardinal O'Hara (District 12) 67-58
 2008: Central Dauphin (District 3) over Mount Lebanon (District 7) 56-49
Class 3A
 2019: Delone Catholic (District 3) over Dunmore (District 2) 49-43
 2018: Neumann-Goretti (District 12) over Bishop Canevin (District 7) 63-46
 2017: Neumann-Goretti (District 12) over Bishop Canevin (District 7) 62-56
 2016: Archbishop Wood (District 12) over Villa Maria (District 10) 46-29
 2015: Blackhawk (District 7) over Archbishop Wood (District 12) 46-40
 2014: Blackhawk (District 7) over Archbishop Wood (District 12) 51-43
 2013: South Park (District 7) over Bethlehem Catholic (District 11) 53-38
 2012: Archbishop Wood (District 12) over Lancaster Catholic (District 3) 52-33
 2011: Archbishop Wood (District 12) over Mercyhurst Prep (District 10) 53-41
 2010: Archbishop Wood (District 12) over Indiana (District 7) 49-39
 2009: Archbishop Carroll (District 12) over Lampeter-Strasburg (District 3) 68-45
 2008: Mount Saint Joseph Academy (District 1) over Mercyhurst Prep (District 10) 53-43
Class 2A
 2019: Bellwood-Antis (District 6) over West Middlesex (District 10) 66-57
 2018: Bellwood-Antis (District 6) over West Catholic (District 12) 45-42
 2017: Minersville (District 11) over Bishop McCort (District 6) 63-49
 2016: Neumann-Goretti (District 12) over North Star (District 5) 65-28
 2015: Neumann-Goretti (District 12) over Seton-La Salle (District 7) 79-34
 2014: Seton-La Salle (District 7) over Neumann-Goretti (District 12) 58-50
 2013: Bishop Canevin (District 7) over York Catholic (District 3) 45-38
 2012: Seton-La Salle (District 7) over York Catholic (District 3) 71-47
 2011: Villa Maria (District 10) over Dunmore (District 2) 62-39
 2010: Villa Maria (District 10) over York Catholic (District 3) 52-44
 2009: Villa Maria (District 10) over York Catholic (District 3) 56-51
 2008: York Catholic (District 3) over Northern Cambria (District 6) 52-40
Class 1A
 2019: Berlin Brothersvalley (District 5) over Lourdes Regional (District 4) 41-32
 2018: Jenkintown (District 1) over Juniata Valley (District 6) 51-46 (OT)
 2017: Lebanon Catholic (District 3) over Juniata Valley (District 6) 55-43
 2016: North Catholic (District 7) over Lourdes Regional (District 4) 56-33
 2015: Vincentian Academy (District 7) over Old Forge (District 2) 86-38
 2014: Vincentian Academy (District 7) over Old Forge (District 2) 58-34
 2013: Tri-Valley (District 11) over Vincentian Academy (District 7) 59-42
 2012: Steelton-Highspire (District 3) over North Catholic (District 7) 66-59
 2011: Steelton-Highspire (District 3) over Bishop Guilfoyle (District 6) 73-60
 2010: Bishop Guilfoyle (District 6) over Northern Cambria (District 6) 49-29
 2009: Bishop Guilfoyle (District 6) over Nativity BVM (District 11) 49-27
 2008: Marian Catholic (District 11) over Mount Alvernia (District 7) 40-34

See also 

 PIAA football records
 PIAA Football Teams, Conferences and Leagues
 NFHS

References

External links 

 PIAA Official Web Site.
 2010–12 PIAA schools' classifications by sport at PIAA.org.

 
High school sports associations in the United States
Sports organizations established in 1913
High school sports in Pennsylvania
1913 establishments in Pennsylvania